Julian Thomas Peterson (born July 28, 1978) is a former American football linebacker who played in the National Football League (NFL) for eleven seasons.  He was drafted by the San Francisco 49ers in the first round of the 2000 NFL Draft.  He played college football for Michigan State University.  Peterson also played for the Seattle Seahawks and the Detroit Lions.

Early years
Peterson attended Crossland High School in Temple Hills, Maryland. He was the 1996 Chesapeake Classic MVP.

College career
Peterson attended Valley Forge Military Academy and College for two years before attending Michigan State. In two seasons at Valley Forge, he recorded 39.5 sacks and was first-team NJCAA All-America and Seaboard Conference Defensive Player of the Year as a sophomore.

Peterson played college football at Michigan State University for his junior and senior year. As a junior, he was the honorable mention All-Big Ten pick by the media.  As a senior, he was an All-American selection by Football News and the Sporting News after recording 15 sacks. In his two years at Michigan State he recorded 140 tackles and 25 sacks in only 23 games.

Professional career

San Francisco 49ers
Peterson was drafted by the San Francisco 49ers in the first round with the 16th overall pick in the 2000 NFL Draft. The 16th overall pick was acquired by San Francisco in a trade with the New York Jets. The Jets were originally given the pick by the New England Patriots, as a result of the controversy of Bill Belichick leaving the Jets’ head coaching position a few months prior to take the same role with the Patriots. As a rookie he started seven of 13 games recording 47 tackles, four sacks, and two interceptions. In 2002 Peterson was elected to the Pro Bowl for the first time after posting 94 tackles. In six seasons in San Francisco he recorded 394 tackles, 21.5 sacks, and five interceptions in 79 games and was elected to two Pro Bowls.

Seattle Seahawks
Peterson signed with the Seattle Seahawks before the 2006 season. In his first season in Seattle, he was selected to the Pro Bowl for the third time after recording 89 tackles and a career-high 10 sacks. In his second season with the Seahawks he was selected to the Pro Bowl for the second straight year after posting 74 tackles and 9.5 sacks. During the 2008 NFL Training Camp, Peterson switched jersey numbers from #59 to #98, the number he wore during his previous tenure at San Francisco. In his third season with the team, Peterson made 86 tackles and five sacks, and was selected to his third consecutive Pro Bowl. In three seasons in Seattle, he recorded 249 tackles, 24.5 sacks, and three interceptions in 48 games and was elected to three Pro Bowls.

Detroit Lions
The Seattle Seahawks traded Peterson to the Detroit Lions for defensive tackle Cory Redding and a 2009 fifth-round pick on March 14, 2009.
On January 5, 2011, Peterson was given his release by the Lions.

NFL statistics

Regular season

Postseason

Personal life
Peterson is married to his wife Aimee and has four sons, Jayson, Jadden, Josiah, and Julian Jr. Julian and Aimee's wedding was featured on WE tv's Platinum Weddings.

References

External links
Detroit Lions bio

1978 births
Living people
People from Prince George's County, Maryland
Players of American football from Maryland
American football outside linebackers
Michigan State Spartans football players
San Francisco 49ers players
Seattle Seahawks players
Detroit Lions players
National Conference Pro Bowl players
Valley Forge Military Academy and College alumni
Valley Forge Military Academy Trojans football players